The 2014 Sun Belt Conference men's basketball tournament was  held in New Orleans, LA from March 13 to March 16 at the Lakefront Arena. The tournament winner received an automatic bid into the 2014 NCAA tournament. The semifinal games were televised on the Sun Belt Network, with the championship game on ESPN, on Sunday March 16.

Seeds
The top eight teams in the Sun Belt Conference qualified for the tournament. Teams were seeded based on conference record and then a tie breaker system was used. The top two seeds received a double bye, and the third and fourth seeds received a single bye.

Schedule

Bracket

References

External links

Sun Belt Conference men's basketball tournament
Tournament
Sun Belt Conference men's basketball tournament
Sun Belt Conference men's basketball tournament